Diogo Nuno Infante de Lacerda (born 28 May 1967 in Lisbon) is a Portuguese theatre, cinema and television actor and television presenter. He is the natural son of Maria Infante de Lacerda by an Englishman named Jonathan and maternal grandson of Renée Lance Infante de Lacerda (born 19 February 1918), daughter of the 5th Barons of Sabroso. He studied at the Lisbon Theatre and Film School (Escola Superior de Teatro e Cinema).

Selected filmography
 Brave New Land (2000)
 Portugal S.A. (2004)
 J.A.C.E. (2011)
 Depois do Adeus (2013 - TV)
 All Inclusive (2014)
 O Beijo do Escorpião (2014) (TVI)
 Jardins Proibidos (2014/15) (TVI)
 A Impostora (2016/17) (TVI)

References

External links

1967 births
21st-century Portuguese male actors
Golden Globes (Portugal) winners
Living people
Lisbon Theatre and Film School alumni
People from Lisbon
Portuguese male voice actors
Portuguese people of British descent
Portuguese television presenters